Edith Agu Ogoke (born 28 August 1990 in Owerri) is a Nigerian female boxer. At the 2012 Summer Olympics, she competed in the Women's middleweight competition, but was defeated in the second round.

At the 2014 Commonwealth Games, she won a bronze medal, beating Shiromali Weerarathna before losing to Savannah Marshall.

References

External links
 
 
 
 
 

1990 births
Living people
Nigerian women boxers
Olympic boxers of Nigeria
Boxers at the 2012 Summer Olympics
Commonwealth Games medallists in boxing
Commonwealth Games bronze medallists for Nigeria
Boxers at the 2014 Commonwealth Games
African Games gold medalists for Nigeria
African Games medalists in boxing
Competitors at the 2015 African Games
People from Owerri
Middleweight boxers
Sportspeople from Imo State
Medallists at the 2014 Commonwealth Games